On 6 April 2009, a Fokker F27-400M Troopship of the Indonesian Air Force crashed into a hangar at Husein Sastranegara International Airport, Bandung, West Java, Indonesia. Witnesses stated that lightning struck the aircraft before the crash. The aircraft was carrying 18 passengers and 6 crew when it crashed. There were no survivors among the 24 people on board.

Flight
The aircraft took off at 08:40 WIB from Halim Perdanakusuma Airport in Jakarta. The aircraft later landed at Husein Sastranegara International Airport in Bandung at 09:00. Two sessions of parachute jumps from the aircraft were planned. The first session occurred at 09:30 for 17 parachutists, all jumped safely. Seventeen parachutists and an instructor were on board the aircraft for the second session at 12:36. However, the flight crew was aware that the weather in the airport were deteriorating, deciding to return to base.

The aircraft was hit by lightning, nose dived and crashed into the hangar, killing everyone on board. Rescue teams found that all of the victims had suffered extreme injuries, making identification difficult.

Because the accident occurred at lunch time, the hangar was relatively empty and nobody on the ground was injured. However, the F27 impacted four aircraft inside the hangar: a NC-212 and a Boeing 737 belonging to Batavia Air, seriously damaging both; an Adam Air Boeing 737 and an Indonesian Aerospace CN-235 received minor damage.

References

Aviation accidents and incidents in Indonesia
Accidents and incidents involving the Fokker F27
Aviation accidents and incidents in 2009
West Java
April 2009 events in Asia
2009 in Indonesia